The Edakkal caves  are two natural caves at a remote location at Edakkal,  from Kalpetta in the Wayanad district of Kerala in India's Western Ghats. Inside the caves are pictorial writings believed to date to at least 6,000 BCE, from the Neolithic man, indicating the presence of a prehistoric settlement in this region. The Stone Age carvings of Edakkal are rare and are the only known examples from South India besides those of Shenthurini, Kollam also in Kerala.

The cave paintings of Shenthurini (Shendurney) forests in Kerala are of the Mesolithic era (middle stone-age).

Petroglyphs 
On one side of the cleft is a rock weighing several tons that covers the cleft to form the 'roof' of the cave. The carvings are of human and animal figures, tools used by humans and of symbols yet to be deciphered, suggesting the presence of a prehistoric settlement.

The petroglyphs inside the cave are of at least three types. The oldest may date back to over 8,000 years. Evidence suggests that the Edakkal caves were inhabited several times at different points in history.

The caves were discovered by Fred Fawcett, a police official of the erstwhile Malabar state in 1890, who immediately recognised their anthropological and historical importance. He wrote an article about them, attracting the attention of scholars.

The cave is also called "Ampukuthy Mala" as it is believed that Rama's sons Lava and Kusha created the cave by striking arrows on the mountain.

Probable links with Indus valley civilization
The caves contain drawings that range over periods from the Neolithic as early as 6,000 BC to 1,000 BCE. The youngest group of paintings have been in the  news for a possible connection to the Indus Valley civilization.

Historian Raghava Varier of the Kerala State Archaeology Department identified a depiction as "man with jar cup" that is the most distinct motif of the Indus valley civilization. The finding, made in September 2009, indicates that the Harappan civilization was active in the region. The "a man with jar cup" symbol from Edakkal seems to be more similar to the Indus motif than those already known from Tamil Nadu and Karnataka. Mr. Varier said "The discovery of the symbols are akin to that of the Harappan civilization having predominantly Dravidian culture and testimony to the fact that cultural diffusion could take place. It is wrong to presume that the Indus culture disappeared into thin air." Iravatham Mahadevan, a scholar of Indus valley and gehsusue scripts said the findings were very significant, calling it a "major discovery".

See also
 Petroglyph
 Rock art
 Rock Shelters of Bhimbetka

Image gallery

Notes

External links 

  On a history trail
 cave-biology.org Cave biology (biospeleology) in India.
 Kerala Trourism

Archaeological cultures in Indiaa
Caves of Kerala
Caves containing pictograms in India
History of Kerala
Archaeological sites in Kerala
Ancient India
Monuments of National Importance in Kerala
Geography of Wayanad district
Tourist attractions in Wayanad district